The Shire of Eltham was a local government area about  northeast of Melbourne, the state capital of Victoria, Australia.

History

Eltham was first incorporated as a road district on 26 September 1856, and became a shire on 6 April 1871. In 1878, it was altered and re-defined. In 1912, it lost some of its area to the Shire of Healesville.

In August 1918, Eltham Shire Council discussed and 'generally expressed themselves as favourable to the proposal' to obtain a "piece of land on the summit of Garden Hill, Kangaroo Ground, and the formation of a memorial park in which a monument could be erected to represent the whole of the Shire." It was opened on Armistice Day, 11 November 1926, by the governor-general, Lord John Baird Stonehaven. The site became known as the Kangaroo Ground War Memorial Park.

On 18 June 1958, it lost its  East Riding to the Shire of Healesville. This area comprised Yarra Glen, Dixons Creek and parts of Christmas Hills. It also lost part of its North Riding, near Kinglake, to the Shire of Yea, on 1 October 1972.

On 15 December 1994, the Shire of Eltham was abolished, and along with parts of the City of Whittlesea and the Shire of Diamond Valley, was merged into the newly created Shire of Nillumbik. The Kinglake district was transferred to the Shire of Murrindindi, while Montmorency and Lower Plenty, in the shire's far southwest, were transferred to the newly created City of Banyule.

Wards

The Shire of Eltham was divided into three ridings on 16 March 1955, each of which elected three councillors:
 Central Riding
 North Riding
 West Riding

Suburbs and localities
 Briar Hill (shared with the Shire of Diamond Valley)
 Christmas Hills (shared with the Shire of Healesville)
 Cottles Bridge
 Eltham*
 Greensborough (shared with the Shire of Diamond Valley)
 Hurstbridge (shared with the City of Whittlesea and the Shire of Diamond Valley)
 Kangaroo Ground
 Kinglake (shared with the Shire of Yea)
 Lower Plenty
 Montmorency
 Panton Hill
 Research
 Smiths Gully
 St Andrews
 Strathewen
 Warrandyte North
 Watsons Creek
 Wattle Glen (shared with the Shire of Diamond Valley)

* Council seat.

Population

* Estimate in 1958 Victorian Year Book.

Books on the Shire of Eltham
 Marshall, Alan, Pioneers and Painters: One Hundred years of Eltham and its Shire Melbourne, Thomas Nelson, 1971 
 Marshall, Marguerite, Nillumbik Now and Then Research, Vic. MPrint Publications, 2008

References

External links
 Victorian Places: Eltham and Eltham Shire

Eltham
Shire of Nillumbik
1994 disestablishments in Australia
1856 establishments in Australia